Leon J. LaPorte (born May 5, 1946) is a retired United States Army General who served as Commander, 1st Cavalry Division from 1995 through 1997 and as Commander, United States Forces Korea until 2006.

Career
LaPorte graduated from the University of Rhode Island with a B.A. degree in biology in 1968 and was commissioned a Second Lieutenant in the U.S. Army as an Armor Officer. From 1969 until 1970 he served with the 3rd Infantry Division, in 1971 he transferred to the 238th Aerial Weapons Company in the Republic of Vietnam. In 1977 he received his M.S. degree in Administration from the University of California, Irvine. From 1977 until 1980 he was an assistant professor at the United States Military Academy. In October 1990 as the Chief of Staff, 1st Cavalry Division he deployed as part of Operation Desert Shield and Desert Storm.  He returned in 1995 to command the 1st Cavalry Division until 1997. From February 2003 until February 2006 he was commander of United States Forces Korea (USFK) and United Nations Forces, Korea. In February he retired from the Army after 38 years of service, handing command to U.S. Army General Burwell B. Bell III.

Despite his reputation as an abrasive and callous commander, LaPorte played a major part in an investigation of the involvement U.S. military personnel in hiring prostitutes and facilitating human trafficking in South Korea. Laporte gave an apology to the families of the two South Korean junior high-school girls that were accidentally run over and killed by a U.S. armored vehicle in 2002.

Awards and decorations

References

1946 births
Living people
People from Providence, Rhode Island
University of Rhode Island alumni
United States Army personnel of the Vietnam War
United States Army aviators
Recipients of the Air Medal
Recipients of the Distinguished Flying Cross (United States)
University of California, Irvine alumni
United States Army personnel of the Gulf War
Recipients of the Legion of Merit
United States Army generals
Recipients of the Distinguished Service Medal (US Army)
Recipients of the Defense Distinguished Service Medal
Commanders, United States Forces Korea